Jenny as a surname may refer to:

William Le Baron Jenney (1832-1907)  American architect and engineer
Hans Jenny (pedologist) (1899–1992), soil scientist
Tina Keller-Jenny (1887-1985) Swiss physician and Jungian psychotherapist
Hans Jenny (cymatics) (1904–1972), father of cymatics, the study of wave phenomena
Zoë Jenny (born 1974), Swiss author
Jean-François Jenny-Clark  (1944-1998) French double bass player
Ladina Jenny (born 1993) Swiss snowboarder
Edward Jenny (born 1947), Recording Artist/Composer/Musician/Photographer/and Software Engineer Swiss|Scottish

See also
William Jennys (1774–1859), American primitive portrait painter